Hoseynabad Gian (also Romanized as Ḩoseynābād Gīān; also known as Hosein Abad and Ḩoseynābād) is a village in Giyan Rural District, Giyan District, Nahavand County, Hamadan Province, Iran. At the 2006 census, its population was 728, in 227 families.

References 

Populated places in Nahavand County